Leo W. "Jack" Fleming Jr. (February 3, 1923 – January 3, 2001) was an American sports announcer for the National Football League's Pittsburgh Steelers and the National Basketball Association's Chicago Bulls in professional sports, and also the West Virginia Mountaineers football and basketball teams. One of his most famous calls was for the Steelers in 1972, on the "Immaculate Reception".

Early life
Leo W. Fleming was born on February 3, 1923. He was a United States Air Force navigator during World War II. He flew 23 combat missions and began his radio career while recuperating at Ashford Military Hospital.

Announcing career

West Virginia University
Jack Fleming, also known as the "Voice of the Mountaineers", served as the school's football and basketball announcer during the periods 1947–1959, 1962–1969, and 1974–1996. Some of Fleming's more memorable calls include calls on Rod Thorn, Major Harris, Jeff Hostetler, Will Drewery, the infamous "Flutie Sack" in 1984, Pat Randolph, Robert Walker's game-winning touchdown run against Miami in 1993, Ed Hill's game-winning touchdown catch against Boston College in 1993, and Amos Zereoué.

Fleming was a seven-time West Virginia sportscaster of the year winner, also receiving the 1996 Gene Morehouse Award from the West Virginia Sports Writers Association and the Chris Schenkel Award from the College Football Hall of Fame in 1999. In 1995, he was inducted into West Virginia University's Order of Vandalia, for outstanding service to the state and school.

Fleming was inducted into the West Virginia University Sports Hall of Fame in 2001.

Professional teams
Fleming also was the sports announcer for the Pittsburgh Steelers (1965–1993) of the NFL and the Chicago Bulls (1970–1973; 1978–1979) of the NBA. Fleming broadcast four Super Bowls, seven AFC Championship Games and an NBA All-Star Game during his tenure with both teams.

His most memorable call was in 1972 on the Steelers' "Immaculate Reception":

References

External links
Jack Fleming's WVU Sports Hall of Fame page

1923 births
2001 deaths
American Basketball Association announcers
Military personnel from West Virginia
United States Army Air Forces personnel of World War II
American radio sports announcers
Chicago Bulls announcers
College basketball announcers in the United States
College football announcers
National Basketball Association broadcasters
National Football League announcers
People from Morgantown, West Virginia
Pittsburgh Steelers announcers
Radio personalities from West Virginia
West Virginia Mountaineers football
West Virginia Mountaineers basketball